SeaTech is a French public engineering school (Grande École). It was created in 2014 from two others engineering schools : ISITV and Supmeca Toulon. 

It offers a Diplôme d'Ingénieur recognized by the Commission of Registered Engineers, equivalent to an Advanced Master’s Degree in Engineering.

The school is located in the south of France, between Toulon and Hyères, on the French Riviera. It focuses on marine sciences and technologies while offering a solid background in engineering.

Engineering Cursus
The SeaTech engineering syllabus takes place over three years.

The first year is based on a multidisciplinary teaching covering all the fields of engineering (mathematics, physics, mechanics, materials science, electronics, computer science, languages, economics, management, communication...).

The school offers six majors to its students in second and third year:

Marine Engineering
Mechanical and Innovation Engineering
Software Engineering
Materials Engineering
Modeling and Simulation Engineering
Mechatronics and Robotics Engineering

Admissions
The main admission to the engineering school requires a pass in a competitive entrance exam, for which students complete two years of intensive post-secondary education called Higher School Preparatory Classes (Classes Préparatoires aux Grandes Écoles).

Foreign students can join SeaTech via this traditional engineering studies route or via the exchange route.

Academic Partnerships
The membership of the school in Polyméca, a French network of engineering schools composed of seven engineering schools teaching mechanics, offers the possibility to the pupils to make a double diploma in one of the schools of the network.

The students have the opportunity to achieve a Double Degree with Cranfield University in England, and with the Escola Politécnica da Universidade de São Paulo in Brazil.

Industrial Partnerships

The school joins forces with industrial partners. The main associates are :

Shipbuilding : Naval Group
Industrial Solutions : CNIM
IT : Sopra Steria

Career Opportunities
This training leads students to numerous job opportunities at the national and international levels in such varied domains as offshore engineering, undersea robotics, oceanography, energy, environment, defense, transportation and information technology.

Research Labs
Five laboratories are geographically located at SeaTech:

Laboratory of Mechanical and Robotic Systems (COSMER).
Laboratory of IT and Systems (LSIS).
Laboratory of Material Sciences in Marine Environment (MAPIEM).
Mediterranean Institute of Oceanography (MIO).
Toulon Institute of Mathematics (IMATH).

Student life

SeaTech has a wealth of student life which enables each student to express themselves through their interests. 

Student office “BDE” : Brings students together by organising major events.
Student clubs : sports, arts, sailing, aero-modelling, robotic...

External links
  (language=fr)
 
 
 
  Avis de la CTI à propos de la création de SeaTech

Notes and references 

Engineering universities and colleges in France
Educational institutions established in 2014
2014 establishments in France